Shaheed Benazir Bhutto University, Shaheed Benazirabad (SBA) or SBBU is a public degree-awarding institution in Nawabshah (SBA), Pakistan. It was established in 2012.

Facilities includes 

★Gymnasium

★Auditorium

★Computer labs

★Library, 

★Mosque

★Canteen 

★Courtyard

★Hostel.

Affiliated colleges 

Government Sachal Sarmast College, Nawabshah

Government Postgraduates College, Nawabshah 

Government Degree Girls College, Nawabshah

Government Degree Boys College, Nawabshah

Government Degree Boys College, Sakrand

Government Degree Girls College, Sakrand

Government Degree Boys College, Doulatpur

Government Degree Girls College, Doulatpur

Government Degree Boys College, Qazi Ahmed

Government Degree College, Daur

Government Degree Boys College, N.Feroze

Government Degree Girls College, N.feroze

Government Degree Mehran College, Moro

Government Degree Girls College, Moro

Government Degree College, Tharushah

Government Degree College, Kandiaro

Government Degree College, Mehrabpur

Government Girls Degree College, Padidan

Government Girls Degree College, Bhariya Road

Mustafa Oriental College New Jatoi

Government Degree Girls College, Sanghar

PSSSS Government Degree College Sanghar

Government Degree Boys College, Shahdadpur

Government Degree Girls College, Shahdadpur

Government NA Degree College, Tando Adam

Government Degree Girls College, Tando Adam

Government Degree College, Khipro

Government Degree College, Shahpur Chakar

UB Government Degree College, Dadu

Government Degree Girls College, Dadu

Government Degree College, K.N. Shah

Government Degree College, Mehar

Government Degree College, Juhi

Government Degree Qazi Arif College Dadu

SBBU Main Campus 
Faculties and Departments 

Faculty of Science and Technology

 Department of Information Technology (IT)
 Department of Chemistry
 Department of Molecular Biology and Genetics
 Department of Statistics

Faculty of Social Sciences

 Department of Education
 Department of English
 Department of Business Administration (BBA)
 Department  of Economics
 Department of Media & Communication Studies
 Department of Sindhi

SBBU Naushero Feroze Campus
It has  2 department

Department of Business Administration(BBA)
Department of Information Technology(IT)

SBBU Sanghar Campus
It has 3 department

 Department of Business Administration(BBA)
 Department of Information Technology(IT)
 Department of English

See also

 Shaheed Benazir Bhutto City University in Karachi
 Shaheed Benazir Bhutto Dewan University in Karachi
 Shaheed Benazir Bhutto University of Veterinary & Animal Sciences in Sakrand, Sindh
 Benazir Bhutto Shaheed University (Karachi) in Karachi, Sindh
 Shaheed Benazir Bhutto University (Sheringal) in Dir, Khyber Pakhtunkhwa
 Shaheed Benazir Bhutto Women University, previously known as the Frontier Women University, in Peshawar, Khyber Pakhtunkhwa
 Shaheed Mohtarma Benazir Bhutto Medical University in Larkana, Sindh

Medical colleges
 Mohtarma Benazir Bhutto Shaheed Medical College
 Shaheed Benazir Bhutto Medical College

Public universities and colleges in Sindh
Memorials to Benazir Bhutto